The men's road race at the 1950 UCI Road World Championships was the 17th edition of the event. The race took place on Sunday 20 August 1950 in Moorslede, Belgium. The race was won by Briek Schotte of Belgium.

Final classification

References

Men's Road Race
UCI Road World Championships – Men's road race